Covenant Party can refer to:
Covenant Party (Morocco)
Covenant Party (Northern Mariana Islands)

See also
 Covenanters, also referred to as the Covenanting party